My First First Love is a South Korean streaming television series starring Ji Soo, Jung Chae-yeon and Jung Jin-young. The first season was released on Netflix on April 18, 2019. The second season was released on July 26, 2019.

The series is a reboot of the 2015 OnStyle drama My First Time, which was produced by the same production company. The latter's writer Jung Hyun-jung is credited as the series creator.

Synopsis
The drama tells the story of five youths and their messy encounters with the concept of first love. Yun Tae-o is a college student whose friends — a college drop-out, a runaway family friend, and his long-time childhood friend — decide to unexpectedly move into his house, due to their own individual reasonings. Now they must all learn to live together and learn to love.

Cast

Main
Ji Soo as Yun Tae-o
Tae-o has been best friends with Song-i since they were in elementary, and feels the constant need to take care of her. Because of this, he has always been conflicted about his feelings towards her, often having a secret on and off crush. He initially pursues a relationship with Ryu Se-hyeon.
Jung Chae-yeon as Han Song-i
Song-i experiences the most hardship out of the entire group, as her father dies and her mother abandons her. She is evicted from her home after her father passes away and left homeless. She is best friends with Tae-o, and she initially understands her relationship with him as platonic. She is an architecture major. She develops a relationship at first with Seo Do-hyeon.
Jung Jin-young as Seo Do-hyeon 
A friend of Tae-o's from college. He focuses on finding a stable job and studying rather than finding a girlfriend. Unlike Tae-o, he does not come from a wealthy family. He is the only one of the group to not live with Tae-o. He develops a relationship with Song-i. However, he then starts to feud with Tae-O over Song-i, thus ending their friendship for a brief period 
Choi Ri as O Ga-rin
Ga-rin and Tae-o's families are friends. She was born into an extremely wealthy family and  heiress to the Daebaek Group. Ga-rin wanted to experience her own independence so she ran away to Tae-o's house in Seoul. She develops a relationship with Hun later.
Kang Tae-oh as Choe Hun
Hun has known Tae-o since elementary but the two didn't become friends until college, before Hun dropped out. Like Tae-o, he comes from a well-off family, but he is financially cut off by his father, a college professor. He continues to pursue on his dream of becoming a musician/actor. He develops a relationship with Ga-rin later.

Recurring
Hong Ji-yoon as Ryu Se-hyeon
A beautiful art major who is 2 years older than Tae-o. He pursues a relationship with her after he mistakes her for being his blind date. She becomes jealous and rude to Song-i because of Tae-o.
Yoon Da-hoon as Yun Jeong-gil, Tae-o's father, who owns a huge amount of land
Park Soo-young as Do-hyeon's father, a dumpling shop owner who struggles to pay the rent
Jung Si-ah as Tae-o's step mother, a bratty woman who is presumably only a few years older than Tae-o and often disapproves of Tae-o
Yoon Bok-in as Song-i's mother, who abandons her for a man
Jeon Soo-kyeong as Ga-rin's mother, a spoiled woman who disapproves of Ga-rin's friends
Jo Seung-yeon as Choe Seok hwan, Hoon's father, an abusive father who only cares about money.
Oh Young-shil as Hun's mother, Hun's mom who is more caring than Hun's father.
Park Yoo-rim as Choe Min-ah, Song-i's friend and a fellow architecture major
Lee Ju-eun as Song-i's friend
Kim Jae-yong as Dae-geon Song-i's former senior who now works for a famous architecture company. 
Jung Yoon-seok as Yun Yeong-ho, Tae-o's younger half-brother

Episodes

Series overview

Season 1

Season 2

Production
The series is pre-produced; filming began in September 2018 and ended in January 2019.

Notes

References

External links
 My First First Love on Netflix
 
 

Korean-language Netflix original programming
South Korean romance television series
2010s romance television series
2019 South Korean television series debuts
2019 South Korean television series endings
South Korean pre-produced television series
2010s college television series
Television series by AStory